Acharya Aryanandi was a prominent Jain monk of the early 20th century. He is best known for his work in establishing several Jain schools in the Indian state of Maharashtra. Several Jain monks before him have also been named Aryanandi.

Biography
Acharya Aryanandi was born in the village of Dhorkin Also Known As Aryanandi Nagar , Paithan, Aurangabad district, Maharashtra, India. He has been the only Jain acharya from the Saitwal community in recent times. He was married in 1927 and had three children, however in 1953 he retired and decided to give up the worldly life. He was He took the brahmacharya vrata from Acharya Shantisagar in 1955. He was initiated as a muni by Muni Samanthabhadra at Kunthalgiri, Maharashtra, on 13 November 1959. He took sallekhana on 8 February 2000 at Navagad (Parbhani).

Contributions
He was held in high esteem and is best remembered for the setting up of several Jain schools in Maharashtra, including the Acharya Arya Nandi Lecture Hall in Ellora, Aurangabad district, Maharashtra. The Jain Gurukul at Ellora was also established by him. The noted German Jainologist, Hermann Kuhn, studied Jain scriptures extensively under the tutelage of Acharya Aryanandi.

See also 
 Acharya Shantisagar
 Jainism in Maharashtra

References

External links 
 Aryanandi Educational and Charitable Trust
 Shri Parshvanatha Brahmacharyashram, Gurukul

Jain acharyas
1907 births
2000 deaths
People from Maharashtra
Indian Jain monks
20th-century Indian Jains
20th-century Jain monks
20th-century Indian monks